Events from the year 1980 in Scotland.

Incumbents 

 Secretary of State for Scotland and Keeper of the Great Seal – George Younger

Law officers 
 Lord Advocate – Lord Mackay of Clashfern
 Solicitor General for Scotland – Nicholas Fairbairn

Judiciary 
 Lord President of the Court of Session and Lord Justice General – Lord Emslie
 Lord Justice Clerk – Lord Wheatley
 Chairman of the Scottish Land Court – Lord Elliott

Events 
 16 April – Glasgow Subway reopened to passengers after a 3-year modernisation project.
 1 May – Scottish District local elections result in big gains for the Labour Party.
 7 May – Aberdeen F.C. secures the Scottish Football League Premier Division championship.
 26 June – The Glasgow Central by-election is held, with Labour retaining the seat despite a 14% swing to the Scottish National Party.
 1 August – The Education (Scotland) Act 1980 receives Royal Assent.
 28 August – First clinically useful image of a patient's internal tissues using magnetic resonance imaging (MRI) is obtained using a full-body scanner built by a team led by John Mallard at the University of Aberdeen.
 4–5 September – Margaret Thatcher becomes the first serving Prime Minister of the United Kingdom to visit Shetland.
 13 September – Hercules, a bear which had gone missing on the island of Benbecula while filming a Kleenex advertisement, is found.
 6 October – West Highland Way opened as the first of the official Long Distance Routes for walkers in Scotland.
 9 October – Gloagtrotter of Perth, trading as GT Coaches, begins operation of an express coach service from Dundee to London as The Stage Coach, origin of the Stagecoach Group.
 October – Albion Motors' Scotstoun works closes and manufacture of complete vehicles (on Viking VK bus chassis) is moved to Leyland in England.
 13 November – Criminal Justice (Scotland) Act 1980 which would decriminalise private homosexual acts between two consenting persons aged over 21 in Scotland passes at Westminster. It would take effect on 1 February 1981.

Births 
 5 January – Greg McHugh, television actor and writer
 5 February – Jo Swinson, leader of the Liberal Democrats (UK)
 2 April – Adam Fleming, television journalist
 12 May – Andrew Abercromby, biomedical engineer
 6 July – Kenny Deuchar, footballer
 27 August – Caroline Brown, lawn bowler
 15 September – Chris Clark, footballer
 19 August – Darius Campbell Danesh, singer-songwriter and actor (died 2022 in the United States)
 12 October – Lesley Paterson, triathlete, screenwriter and producer
 26 October – Khalid Abdalla, actor
 20 November – Malachy Tallack, journalist and folk rock musician
 13 December – Gary Innes, piano-accordionist, shinty player and BBC broadcaster
 Kerry Hudson, writer

Deaths 
 19 February – Bon Scott, Australian rock singer (born 1946)
 29 February – Margaret Morris, choreographer (born 1891 in London)
 May – Isla Cameron, actress and singer (born 1930)
 23 June – John Laurie, actor (born 1897)
 6 December – Margot Bennett, crime novelist (born 1912)
 13 December – R. D. Low, comics writer and editor (born 1895)
 Hector MacAndrew, fiddler (born 1903)

The arts
 19 February – Scottish Television begins to air the soap opera Take the High Road.
 Spring – Bearsden post-punk band Orange Juice release Falling and Laughing, the first release on the Postcard Records label.
 June – Peter Maxwell Davies's The Yellow Cake Revue (including the piano interlude "Farewell to Stromness") is premiered at the Stromness Hotel as part of the St Magnus Festival.
 Alexander Moffat paints Poets' Pub.
 Buxton Orr composes A Caledonian Suite.

See also 
 1980 in Northern Ireland

References 

 
Years of the 20th century in Scotland
1980s in Scotland